The knight (♘, ♞) is a piece in the game of chess, represented by a horse's head and neck. It moves two squares vertically and one square horizontally, or two squares horizontally and one square vertically, jumping over other pieces. Each player starts the game with two knights on the b- and g-, each located between a rook and a bishop.

Movement
Compared to other chess pieces, the knight's movement is unique: it moves two squares vertically and one square horizontally, or two squares horizontally and one square vertically (with both forming the shape of a capital L). When moving, the knight can jump over pieces to reach its destination. Knights capture in the same way, replacing the enemy piece on the square and removing it from the board. A knight can have up to eight available moves at once. Knights and pawns are the only pieces that can be moved in the chess starting position.

Value

Bishops utilize a longer range, but they can move only to squares of one color. The knight's value increases in  since it can jump over blockades. Knights and bishops are stronger when supported by other pieces (such as pawns) to create outposts and become more powerful when they advance, as long as they remain .

Properties

Enemy pawns are effective at harassing knights because a pawn attacking a knight is not itself attacked by the knight. For this reason, a knight is effective when placed in a weakness in the opponent's pawn structure, i.e. a square which cannot be attacked by enemy pawns. In the diagram, White's knight on d5 is very powerful – more powerful than Black's bishop on g7.

Whereas two bishops cover each other's weaknesses, two knights tend not to cooperate with each other as efficiently. As such, a pair of bishops is usually considered better than a pair of knights. World Champion José Raúl Capablanca considered that a queen and a knight is usually a better combination than a queen and a bishop. However, Glenn Flear found no game of Capablanca's that supported his statement; statistics do not support the statement, either. In an endgame without other pieces or pawns, two knights generally have a better chance of forming a drawing fortress against a queen than do two bishops or a bishop and a knight.

Compared to a bishop, a knight is often not as good in an endgame. A knight can exert control over only one part of the board at a time and often takes multiple moves to reposition to a new location, which often makes it less suitable in endgames with pawns on both sides of the board. This limitation is less important, however, in endgames with pawns on only one side of the board. Knights are superior to bishops in an endgame if all the pawns are on one side of the board. Furthermore, knights have the advantage of being able to control squares of either color, unlike a lone bishop. Nonetheless, a disadvantage of the knight (compared to the other pieces) is that by itself it cannot lose a move to put the opponent in zugzwang (see triangulation and tempo), while a bishop can. In the position pictured on the right, if the knight is on a white square and it is White's turn to move, White cannot win. Similarly, if the knight were on a black square and it were Black's turn to move, White cannot win. In the other two cases, White would win. If instead of the knight, White had a bishop on either color of square, White would win with either side to move.

In an endgame where one side has only a king and a knight while the other side has only a king, the game is a draw since a checkmate is impossible. When a bare king faces a king and two knights, a checkmate can never be ; checkmate can occur only if the opponent commits a blunder by moving their king to a square where it can be checkmated on the next move. Checkmate can be forced with a bishop and knight, however, or with two bishops, even though the bishop and knight are in general about equal in value. Paradoxically, checkmate with two knights sometimes can be forced if the weaker side has a single extra pawn, but this is a curiosity of little practical value (see two knights endgame). Pawnless endgames are a rarity, and if the stronger side has even a single pawn, an extra knight should give them an easy win. A bishop can trap (although it cannot then capture) a knight on the rim (see diagram), especially in the endgame.

Stamma's mate
In a few rare endgame positions where the opposing king is trapped in a corner in front of its own pawn, it is possible to force mate with only a king and knight in a pattern known as Stamma's mate, which has occasionally been seen in practice. In the position below, from Nogueiras–Gongora, Cuban championship 2001, Black played 75...Nxf6, incorrectly assuming that the ending would be drawn following the capture of the last white pawn on a2. (Correct was 75...Ne3 76.Kg6 Ng4 77.Kg7 and now 77...Nxf6! may be safely played, the king being sufficiently distant). Play continued 76.Nxf6 Ke5 77.Nd7+ Kd4 78.Kf4 Kc3 79.Ke3 Kb2 80.Kd2 Kxa2 81.Kc2 Ka1 82.Nc5 Ka2 83.Nd3 Ka1 84.Nc1 and Black resigned, as 84...a2 85.Nb3 is mate.

Notation
In algebraic notation, the usual modern way of recording chess games, the letter N stands for the knight (K is reserved for the king); in descriptive chess notation, Kt is sometimes used instead, mainly in older literature. In chess problems and endgame studies, the letter S, standing for Springer, the German name for the piece, is often used (and in some variants of fairy chess, N is used for the nightrider, a popular fairy chess piece).

History
The knight has the oldest defined movement of any chess piece. It was first introduced in the Indian game of chaturanga around the 6th century; it has not changed since.

Variants
Pieces similar to the knight are found in almost all games of the chess family. The ma of xiangqi and janggi is slightly more restricted; conceptually, the piece is considered to pass through the adjacent orthogonal point, which must be unoccupied, rather than "jumping". Another related piece is the keima of shogi, which moves like a knight but can move only two squares forward followed by one square sideways, restricting its movement to two possible squares.

Names
The knight is colloquially sometimes referred to as a "horse", which is also the translation of the piece's name in several languages: Spanish caballo, Italian cavallo, Russian конь, etc. Some languages refer to it as the "jumper", reflecting the knight's ability to move over pieces in its path: Polish skoczek, Danish/Norwegian springer, Swedish springare, German Springer, Luxembourgish Sprénger, Slovene skakač. In Sicilian it is called sceccu, a slang term for a donkey, derived from the Arabic sheikh, who during the Islamic period rode from village to village on donkeys collecting taxes.

In mathematics
The knight is relevant in some mathematical problems. For example, the knight's tour problem is the problem of finding a series of moves by a knight on a chessboard in which every square is visited exactly once.

Knight variations
Even among sets of the standard Staunton pattern, the style of the pieces varies. The knights vary considerably. Here are some examples.

Unicode

Unicode defines two codepoints for knight:

♘ U+2658 White Chess Knight (HTML &#9816;)

♞ U+265E Black Chess Knight (HTML &#9822;)

See also

Notes

Citations

References

External links

Piececlopedia: Knight by Fergus Duniho and Hans Bodlaender, The Chess Variant Pages
“The Knight Challenge” by Edward Winter

Chess pieces
Horses in art